John Carroll O'Connor (August2, 1924– June21, 2001) was an American actor, producer, and director whose television career spanned over four decades. He became a lifelong member of the Actors Studio in 1971.  O'Connor found widespread fame as Archie Bunker (for which he won four Emmy Awards), the main character in the CBS television sitcoms All in the Family (1971–1979) and its continuation, Archie Bunker's Place (1979–1983). O'Connor later starred in the NBC/CBS television crime drama In the Heat of the Night (1988–1995), where he played the role of police chief William "Bill" Gillespie. At the end of his career in the late 1990s, he played Gus Stemple, the father of Jamie Buchman (Helen Hunt) on Mad About You. In 1996, O'Connor was ranked number 38 on TV Guides 50 Greatest TV Stars of All Time. He won five Emmys and two Golden Globe Awards.

Early life
Carroll O'Connor, the eldest of three sons, was born on August2, 1924, in Manhattan, New York City, to Edward Joseph O'Connor, a lawyer, and his wife, Elise Patricia O'Connor (née O'Connor), a teacher. Both of his brothers became doctors: Hugh, who died in a motorcycle accident in 1961, and Robert, a psychiatrist in New York City. O'Connor spent much of his youth in Elmhurst and Forest Hills, Queens, which is where his character Archie Bunker would later live.

O'Connor graduated from Newtown High School in Elmhurst. In 1941, he enrolled at Wake Forest University in North Carolina but dropped out when the United States entered World War II. During the war, he was rejected by the United States Navy and enrolled in the United States Merchant Marine Academy for a short time. After leaving that institution, he became a merchant seaman and served in the United States Merchant Marine during the war.

After the war, O'Connor attended the University of Montana, where he worked at the Montana Kaimin student newspaper as an editor; in 1949 he resigned his editing position in protest to the pressure from the campus administration that led to the confiscation and destruction of an issue of the paper, which carried a cartoon depicting the Montana Board of Education as rats gnawing at a bag of university funds. At the University of Montana, he also joined the Sigma Phi Epsilon fraternity. O'Connor did not take any drama courses as an undergraduate at the University of Montana, but he did act in student theater productions. He met Nancy Fields (born 1929), who later became his wife, when she was working as a makeup artist and lighting technician in a student-produced production of Our Town. He later left that university to help his younger brother Hugh get into medical school in Ireland, where Carroll completed his undergraduate studies at University College Dublin. There he studied Irish history and English literature, graduated in 1952, and began his acting career.

After O'Connor's fiancée, Nancy Fields, graduated from the University of Montana in 1951 with degrees in drama and English, she sailed to Ireland to study at Trinity College Dublin and met Carroll, who was visiting his brother, Hugh. The couple married in Dublin on July28, 1951. In 1956, O'Connor returned to the University of Montana to earn a master's degree in speech.

Prolific character actor
After acting in theatrical productions in Dublin and New York during the 1950s, O'Connor's breakthrough came when he was cast by director Burgess Meredith (assisted by John Astin) in a featured role in the Broadway adaptation of James Joyce's novel Ulysses. O'Connor and Meredith remained close, lifelong friends.

O'Connor made his television acting debut as a character actor on two episodes of Sunday Showcase. These two parts led to other roles on such television series as The Americans, The Eleventh Hour, Bonanza, The Fugitive, The Wild Wild West, Armstrong Circle Theatre, The Outer Limits, The Great Adventure, The Man from U.N.C.L.E., Dr. Kildare, I Spy, That Girl, Premiere, Voyage to the Bottom of the Sea and Insight, among many others. O'Connor starred as an Eastern European villain in the first season of Mission Impossible, season one, episode 18 "The Trial". Late in his career, he appeared on several episodes of Mad About You as the father of Helen Hunt's character.

Considered roles
He was among the actors considered for the roles of the Skipper on Gilligan's Island and Dr. Smith in the TV show Lost in Space, and he was the visual template in the creation of Batman nemesis Rupert Thorne, a character who debuted at the height of All in the Family success in Detective Comics No. 469 (published May 1976 by DC Comics).

Early film roles

O'Connor appeared in a number of studio films in the 1960s and early 1970s, including Lonely Are the Brave (1962), Cleopatra (1963), In Harm's Way (1965), What Did You Do in the War, Daddy? (1966), Hawaii (1966), Not with My Wife, You Don't! (1966), Warning Shot (1967), Point Blank (1967), The Devil's Brigade (1968), For Love of Ivy (1968), Death of a Gunfighter (1969), Marlowe (1969), Kelly's Heroes (1970) and Doctors' Wives (1971). In many of his roles he portrayed a military or police officer, in several a particularly blustery one.

Television roles

In the 1960s, O'Connor appeared in episodes of notable television series such as The Americans, The Untouchables, Naked City, Death Valley Days, Bonanza, The Defenders, The Outer Limits, The Fugitive, The Man from U.N.C.L.E., Voyage to the Bottom of the Sea, Ben Casey, Dr. Kildare, I Spy, The Wild Wild West, Mission: Impossible, The Time Tunnel, That Girl and  Gunsmoke (1966 - "The Wrong Man"; S12E7).

O'Connor also performed in anthology television shows such as NBC Sunday Showcase, The United States Steel Hour, Armstrong Circle Theatre, The Play of the Week, The Dick Powell Show, Alcoa Premiere, The DuPont Show of the Week, Profiles in Courage and Bob Hope Presents the Chrysler Theatre.

All in the Family

O'Connor was living in Italy in 1968 when producer Norman Lear asked him to come to New York City and star in a series that he was creating for ABC titled Justice For All. Lear recruited O'Connor to play the role of Archie Justice, a bigot who was able to bring forth some measure of empathy from the audience. After two television pilots of the sitcom were produced (between 1968 and 1970), the hosting network was changed to CBS. For the third pilot, the last name of its main character was changed to Bunker, and its title was changed to All in the Family. The show was based on the BBC's Till Death Us Do Part, and Bunker was based on Alf Garnett, but he was somewhat less abrasive than the original British character.
O'Connor's Queens background and his ability to speak with a working-class New York accent both influenced Lear to set the show in Queens.

Desiring a well known actor to play the lead, Lear approached Mickey Rooney, but he declined the role. O'Connor accepted the role because he did not expect the show to succeed, and he believed that he would move back to Europe when it failed. In her book Archie & Edith, Mike & Gloria: the Tumultuous History of All in the Family, Donna McCrohan revealed that O'Connor had requested that Lear provide him with a return airplane ticket to Rome as a condition of his acceptance of the role so that he could return to Italy when the show failed. Instead, All in the Family became the highest-rated show on American television for five consecutive seasons.

While O'Connor's personal politics were liberal, he understood the Bunker character and played him not only with bombast and humor but with touches of vulnerability. The show's writing was consistently left of center, but O'Connor, while his character held right-wing views, could also deftly skewer the liberal pieties of the day. Bunker was famous for his English language malapropisms, but O'Connor was in truth a highly educated and cultured man and taught English before he turned to acting. Archie Bunker's long-suffering wife Edith was played by Jean Stapleton, also from New York City, a Broadway actress whom Lear remembered from the play and film Damn Yankees. The show also starred unknown character actors Rob Reiner as Archie's liberal son-in-law Michael "Meathead" Stivic and Sally Struthers as Gloria, Archie and Edith's only child and Mike's wife.

CBS debated whether the controversial subject matter of All in the Family would mesh with a sitcom. Racial issues, ethnicities, religions, class, education, women's equality, gun control, politics, inflation, the Vietnam War, energy crisis, Watergate and other timely topics of the 1970s were addressed. Like its British predecessor Till Death Us Do Part, the show lent dramatic social substance to the traditional sitcom format. Archie Bunker's popularity made O'Connor a top-billing star of the 1970s. O'Connor was apprehensive of being typecast for playing the role, but at the same time he was protective, not just of his character, but of the entire show.

A contract dispute between O'Connor and Lear marred the beginning of the show's fifth season. Eventually O'Connor received a raise and appeared in the series until it ended. For his work as Archie Bunker, he was nominated for eight Emmy Awards as Outstanding Lead Actor in a Comedy Series; he won the award four times (1972, 1977, 1978 and 1979). At the end of the eighth season in 1978, Reiner and Struthers left the series to pursue other projects.

Rob Reiner said in a 2014 interview about his on- and off-screen chemistry with O'Connor: "We did over 200 shows in front of a live audience. So I learned a lot about what audiences like, what they don't like, how stories are structured. I would spend a lot of time in the writing room and I actually wrote some scripts. And from Carroll O'Connor I learned a lot about how you perform and how important the script and story are for the actors. So the actor doesn't have to push things. You can let the story and the dialogue support you if it's good. I had great people around me, and I took from all the people who were around." Comparing O'Connor's character to Archie Bunker, Reiner said: "Carroll O'Connor brought his humanity to the character even though he had these abhorrent views. He's still a feeling, human being. He loved his wife even though he acted the way he did, and he loved his daughter. Those things come out. I don't think anybody's all good or all bad."

Archie Bunker's Place

When All in the Family ended after nine seasons, Archie Bunker's Place continued in its place and ran for four additional years. Longtime friend and original series star Jean Stapleton kept her role as Edith Bunker, but she was limited to five guest appearances in Season 1. In the second-season premiere, her character died of a stroke, leaving Archie to cope with the loss. The show was canceled in 1983. O'Connor was angered about the show's cancellation, maintaining that the show ended with an inappropriate finale. He would later work for CBS again when he starred in In the Heat of the Night on NBC and they decided not to renew the series. CBS allowed the series to continue for two more years and have a proper ending.

In the Heat of the Night

While coping with his son's drug problem, O'Connor starred as Sparta, Mississippi, Police Chief Bill Gillespie, a tough veteran cop on In the Heat of the Night. Based on the novel by John Ball and the 1967 movie of the same name, the series debuted on NBC in March 1988 and performed well. He cast his inexperienced  son Hugh O'Connor as Officer Lonnie Jamison. The headquarters of the Sparta Police Department was actually the library in Covington, Georgia.

In 1989, while working on the set, O'Connor was hospitalized and underwent open heart surgery, which caused him to miss four episodes at the end of the second season. (Actor Joe Don Baker took his place in those episodes as an acting police chief.) O'Connor would later serve as one of the executive producers for the series, starting with the third season. The series was transferred from NBC to CBS in 1992 and cancelled two years later after its seventh season. O'Connor reprised his role the following year for four two-hour In the Heat of the Night television films.

While on the series, O'Connor recorded "Bring a Torch, Jeanette Isabella" for the 1991 In the Heat of the Night Christmas CD Christmas Time's A Comin'''. He was joined by Grand Ole Opry star mandolinist Jesse McReynolds, Nashville accordionist Abe Manuel Jr., and Nashville fiddlers Buddy Spicher and Randall Franks. CD Producer and series co-star Randall Franks created the arrangement which was co-produced by series co-star Alan Autry. He joined other members of the cast for a recording of "Jingle Bells" with vocals by Country Music Hall of Fame members Little Jimmy Dickens, Kitty Wells, Pee Wee King, The Marksmen Quartet, Bobby Wright, Johnnie Wright and Ken Holloway. According to MeTV, Carroll wrote several episodes under the pseudonym Matt Harris.

Career honors
 Golden Globe Award for Best Actor – Television Series Musical or Comedy, 1972, All in the Family Primetime Emmy Award for Outstanding Lead Actor in a Comedy Series, 1971, 1976, 1977, and 1978, All in the Family George Foster Peabody Broadcasting Award, 1980, for Archie Alone episode, Archie Bunker's Place Primetime Emmy Award for Outstanding Lead Actor in a Drama Series, 1989, In the Heat of the Night Golden Globe Award for Best Actor – Television Series Drama, 1989, In the Heat of the Night Golden Globe Award for Best Actor – Television Series Drama nomination 1990, In the Heat of the Night'
 Television Academy Hall of Fame, inducted 1990 for contributions to the television industry
 NAACP Image Award, 1992, In the Heat of the Night Best Dramatic Series NAACP Image Award, 1993, In the Heat of the Night Best Dramatic SeriesOther honors
In 1973, his fraternity conferred its highest honor, the Sigma Phi Epsilon Citation, on him.

O'Connor is the only male actor to have won the lead acting Emmy Award in both the comedy and drama series categories.

In July 1991, O'Connor, Jean Stapleton, Reiner, and Sally Struthers reunited to celebrate the 20th anniversary of All in the Family. With reruns airing in syndication on TV Land, Antenna TV and CBS, the show's popularity continued.

In March 2000, O'Connor received a star on the Hollywood Walk of Fame and was given a St. Patrick's Day tribute by MGM.

O'Connor's caricature is displayed at Sardi's restaurant in New York City's Theater District.

Personal life
In 1962, while he was in Rome filming Cleopatra, O'Connor and his wife Nancy Fields O'Connor adopted a six-day-old boy, naming him Hugh after O'Connor's brother who had died a year earlier. At age 17, Hugh worked as a courier on the set of Archie Bunker's Place. O'Connor eventually created the role of Officer Lonnie Jamison on In the Heat of the Night for his son.

O'Connor was a devout Catholic who regularly attended Mass.

In 1989, O'Connor was admitted to the hospital for heart bypass surgery and quit his 30-year smoking habit.

On March 28, 1995, O'Connor's son Hugh took his own life after a long battle with drug addiction. Following his son's death, O'Connor appeared in public service announcements for the Partnership for a Drug-Free America and spent the rest of his life working to raise awareness about drug addiction. O'Connor also successfully lobbied the state of California to pass legislation allowing family members of an addicted person or anyone injured by a drug dealer's actions, including employers, to sue for reimbursement for medical treatment, rehabilitation costs and other economic and noneconomic damages. The law, known as the Drug Dealer Civil Liability Act, went into effect in 1997. It is also referred to as the Hugh O'Connor Memorial Law. The act is based on the 1992 Model Drug Dealer Liability Act, which has been passed in 17 states and the U.S. Virgin Islands. Cases have been brought under the act in states such as California, Illinois, and Utah.

His son's suicide inspired O'Connor to start a crusade against the man who had sold the drugs to Hugh. He called Harry Perzigian "a partner in murder" and a "sleazeball," and Perzigian countered with a defamation lawsuit against O'Connor. In 1997, a California jury decided in O'Connor's favor. In an interview on CNN's Larry King Live soon after the verdict, O'Connor said that he would never be able to put his son's death behind him, saying: "I can't forget it. There isn't a day that I don't think of him and want him back and miss him, and I'll feel that way until I'm not here anymore."

During the late 1990s, O'Connor established a small automotive restoration shop in Newbury Park, California. Called Carroll O'Connor Classics, the shop contained many of O'Connor's personal vehicles and the cars once owned by his late son. Among the cars O'Connor owned were a Rolls-Royce Silver Shadow sold to him by William Harrah, a Maserati 3500 GT, and a Dodge Challenger equipped with a 440-cubic inch V-8, which he drove during production of All in the Family.

In 1997, the O'Connors donated US$1 million (worth $ today) to their alma mater to help match a challenge grant to the University of Montana from the National Endowment for the Humanities. The university named a regional studies and public policy institute the O'Connor Center for the Rocky Mountain West. Afterward, O'Connor taught screenwriting at the university.

In 1998, O'Connor underwent a second surgery to clear the blockage in a carotid artery in order to reduce his risk of stroke.

Death

O'Connor died at the age of 76 on June 21, 2001, in Culver City, California from a heart attack brought on by complications from diabetes. His funeral Mass was celebrated at St. Paul the Apostle Catholic Church in Westwood, and was attended by All in the Family cast members Rob Reiner, Sally Struthers, and Danielle Brisebois, as well as producer Norman Lear. Jean Stapleton, a close friend of O'Connor's since the early 1960s, did not attend the service because of a commitment for a stage performance.

O'Connor's best friend Larry Hagman and his family attended the funeral, along with the surviving cast of In the Heat of the Night, including Alan Autry and Denise Nicholas. Actor Martin Sheen, then starring on The West Wing, delivered the eulogy. O'Connor's body was buried at Westwood Village Memorial Park Cemetery with his son Hugh's cenotaph placed on his gravestone.

In honor of O'Connor's career, TV Land moved an entire weekend of programming to the next week and showed a continuous marathon of All in the Family. During the commercial breaks, TV Land also showed interview footage of O'Connor and various All in the Family actors, producers with whom he had worked, and other associates. His wife Nancy Fields O'Connor died on November 10, 2014, at age 84.

Filmography

 as Actor 
 Film 

 Television 

 Theater 

 as Other 

Author
 I Think I'm Outta Here'' (1999) Autobiography

Accolades

Emmy Awards

Golden Globes

Walk of Fame

See also

References

External links

 
 
 
 
 

1924 births
2001 deaths
20th-century American male actors
20th-century American male writers
20th-century American screenwriters
Alumni of University College Dublin
American male film actors
American male television actors
American male television writers
American military personnel of World War II
American people of Irish descent
American Roman Catholics
American sailors
American television directors
American television writers
Best Musical or Comedy Actor Golden Globe (television) winners
Burials at Westwood Village Memorial Park Cemetery
Catholics from New York (state)
Deaths from diabetes
Male actors from New York City
Military personnel from New York City
Military personnel from New York (state)
Newtown High School alumni
Outstanding Performance by a Lead Actor in a Comedy Series Primetime Emmy Award winners
Outstanding Performance by a Lead Actor in a Drama Series Primetime Emmy Award winners
People from Elmhurst, Queens
People from Forest Hills, Queens
Screenwriters from New York (state)
Television producers from New York City
United States Merchant Marine Academy alumni
United States Merchant Mariners
United States Merchant Mariners of World War II
University of Montana alumni
University of Montana faculty
Wake Forest University alumni